Henry Inman (2 November 1886 – 12 March 1967) was a British wrestler. He competed in the freestyle featherweight event at the 1920 Summer Olympics.

References

External links
 

1886 births
1967 deaths
Olympic wrestlers of Great Britain
Wrestlers at the 1920 Summer Olympics
British male sport wrestlers
Place of birth missing